Marco is an unincorporated community in Stoddard County, in the U.S. state of Missouri.

History
A post office called Marco was established in 1905, and remained in operation until 1914. It is unclear why the name "Marco" was applied to this community, although several traditions attempt to explain its origin.

References

Unincorporated communities in Stoddard County, Missouri
Unincorporated communities in Missouri
1905 establishments in Missouri